This page lists the World Best Year Performance in the year 2005 in the men's decathlon. The main event during this season were the 2005 World Championships in Helsinki, Finland, where the competition started on Tuesday August 9, 2005 and ended on Wednesday August 10, 2005 in the Helsinki Olympic Stadium.

Records

2005 World Year Ranking

See also
2005 Décastar
2005 Hypo-Meeting

References
decathlon2000
IAAF
apulanta

2005
Decathlon Year Ranking, 2005